Wes Smith may refer to:

 Wes Smith (American football), wide receiver in the National Football League
 Wes Smith (Australian footballer) (born 1945), Australian rules footballer
 Wes Smith (curler) (born 1940), American wheelchair curler

See also
 Wesley Smith (disambiguation)